Dietmar Köhlbichler (born 13 September 1963) is an Austrian former alpine skier.

World Cup results
Podiums

Europa Cup results
Kohlbichler has won an overall Europa Cup and one discipline cup.

FIS Alpine Ski Europa Cup
Overall: 1984
Slalom: 1984

References

External links
 
 

1963 births
Living people
Austrian male alpine skiers
People from Reutte District
Sportspeople from Tyrol (state)
20th-century Austrian people